The Great Comet of 1264 (C/1264 N1) was one of the brightest comets on record. It appeared in July 1264 and remained visible to the end of September. It was first seen during the evenings after sunset, but appeared in its greatest splendor in weeks afterward, when it became visible during the mornings in the northeastern sky, with the tail perceived long before the comet itself rose above the horizon.
The head of the comet seemed like an obscure and ill-defined star, and the tail passed from this portion of it like expanded flames, stretching forth towards the mid-heavens to a distance of one hundred degrees from the nucleus.
The comet of 1264 was described  to have been an object of great size and brilliancy. The comet's splendor was greatest at the end of August and the beginning of September. At that time, when the head was just visible above the eastern horizon in the morning sky, the tail stretched out past the mid-heaven towards the west, or was nearly 100° in length.

The chroniclers of the time mention the various remarkable events which occurred in Europe at this period, and in particular connect the appearance of the comet with the death of Pope Urban IV, who allegedly fell sick on the very day when the comet was first seen, and died at the exact time it disappeared on October 3, 1264. It was said that the "prodigy of a hairy star" had brought upon his illness, and slipped away when the job was finished.

This comet was likewise observed in China, and the descriptions agree with the statements of the European historians.

Alleged connection to the Great Comet of 1556

Some astronomers speculated that the Great Comet of 1556 and the Great comet of 1264 are the same comet. Alexandre Guy Pingré, who in his Cométographie (1783) calls the Great comet of 1264 a "great and celebrated comet", calculated the comet's parabolic orbit, which he found bore great resemblance to that of the comet of 1556. The comet of 1264, says Pingré, "is very probably the same as that of 1556; its periodical revolution is about 292 years; and its return may consequently be expected about 1848."

John Russell Hind in On the expected return of the great comet of 1264 and 1556 says:

However, in 1877, Amédée Guillemin wrote, in part quoting Babinet,

Comets sometimes may disappear because of orbital derangement from an ellipse to a parabola or a hyperbola. Sir Isaac Newton showed that a body controlled by the Sun moves in a conic section—that is, an ellipse, a parabola or a hyperbola. Because the latter two are open curves, a comet which pursued such a path would go off into space never to reappear. A derangement of orbit from closed to open curve has doubtless happened often.

References

Non-periodic comets
1264
13th century in science
126407
Great comets